Giant-cell reticulohistiocytoma (also known as Solitary reticulohistiocytoma and Solitary reticulohistiocytosis) is a cutaneous condition characterized by a solitary skin lesion.

See also 
 Indeterminate cell histiocytosis
 List of cutaneous conditions

References 

Monocyte- and macrophage-related cutaneous conditions